Pushpak Bhattacharyya is a computer scientist and a professor at Computer Science and Engineering Department, IIT Bombay. He served as the director of Indian Institute of Technology Patna from 2015 to 2021. He is a past president of Association for Computational Linguistics (2016–17), and Ex-Vijay and Sita Vashee Chair Professor He currently heads the Natural language processing research group Center For Indian Language Technology (CFILT) lab at IIT Bombay.

Education
He completed his undergraduate studies from IIT Kharagpur (B. Tech.) and Masters from IIT Kanpur (M.Tech). He finished his Ph.D. from IIT Bombay in 1994.

Research
His research areas are Natural Language Processing, Artificial Intelligence, Machine Learning, Psycholinguistics, Eye Tracking, Information Retrieval, and Indian Language WordNets - IndoWordNet. A significant contribution of his research is Multilingual Lexical Knowledge Bases like IndoWordNet and Projection. He is the author of the text book ‘Machine Translation’. He has led government and industry projects of international and national importance and has received faculty grants from IBM, Microsoft, Yahoo and the United Nations.

Awards
Patwardhan Award of IIT Bombay for Technology Development
VNMM award of IIT Roorkee for Technology Development
Fellow of National Academy of Engineering
Eminent Engineer awardee of Institution of Engineers

References

External links
Homepage
Publications
NPTEL Lectures on NLP
CFILT

1962 births
Living people
Artificial intelligence researchers
Machine learning researchers
Indian computer scientists
Academic staff of the Indian Institute of Technology Patna
Academic staff of IIT Bombay
IIT Kanpur alumni
IIT Kharagpur alumni
IIT Bombay alumni
Indian Institute of Technology directors
Natural language processing researchers
Presidents of the Association for Computational Linguistics